Phillip Jacob Nelson (born 1929) is an emeritus professor at Binghamton University, where he was Bartle Professor of Economics. He is noted for having been the first to observe the distinction between an experience good and a search good.

Nelson obtained his doctorate in 1957 from Columbia University, with a dissertation titled "A Study in the Geographic Mobility of Labor".

Selected publications
Research articles

Books
.

References

External links

Living people
1929 births
American economists
Columbia University alumni
Binghamton University faculty